Sir Archy (or Archy, Archie, or Sir Archie; 1805–1833) was an American Thoroughbred racehorse considered one of the best racehorses of his time and later one of the most important sires in American history. He was inducted into the National Museum of Racing and Hall of Fame in the inaugural class of 1955.

Early life

Born and bred in Virginia by two Americans, Capt. Archibald Randolph and Col. John Tayloe III, Sir Archy's sire was the inaugural Epsom Derby winner Diomed, who had been imported from England as an older horse by Tayloe. His dam, a blind mare named Castianira, had been purchased in England by Tayloe for his own Mount Airy Farm, but was bred on shares with his friend Randolph. Sir Archy, Castianira's second foal, was born on Randolph's Ben Lomond Plantation on the James River in Goochland County.  The colt, dark bay with a small patch of white on his right hind pastern, was originally named "Robert Burns"; Tayloe changed the colt's name in honor of Randolph.

On the track

When Sir Archy was two, Tayloe and Randolph sold him to Ralph Wormely IV for $400 and an unknown filly. When Wormely later decided to quit horse racing Sir Archy was offered for sale, but there were no takers. Still owned by Wormely, Sir Archy made his first start in the Washington Jockey Club Sweepstakes late in his three-year-old season. Though Sir Archy had not yet recovered from a case of strangles, Wormely ran him rather than pay a forfeit fee. Still unwell, Sir Archy made his second start a month later at the Fairfield Sweepstakes in Richmond, Virginia. Though he won only the third heat and finished third overall to Col. William Ransom Johnson's colt True Blue, Johnson promptly bought Sir Archy for $1,500.

Now in the hands of Johnson's trainer, Arthur Taylor, Sir Archy became one of the greatest runners of his day, excelling in four-mile heats. Johnson wrote, "I have only to say that, in my opinion, Sir Archy is the best horse I ever saw, and I well know that I never had any thing to do with one that was at all his equal; and this I will back; for, if any horse in the world, will run against him at any half way ground, four mile heats, according to the rules of racing, you may consider me $5000 with you on him.   He was in good condition this fall, (1809) and has not run with any horse that could put him to half speed towards the end of the race."

One of his most important matches was with Blank, in which Sir Archy won the first heat in 7:53 – the fastest time ever run to that point south of the James River. Following that race, he was purchased for $5,000 by General William Richardson Davie, the governor of North Carolina. Davie retired the horse to stud because there were no opponents willing to race against him.  His record on the racetrack was 7 starts, with 4 wins and 1 second.

At stud

Sir Archy then became what most experts consider to be the first great Thoroughbred stallion bred in America. He went to stud, at first under Davie, then under Davie's son, who appears to have stood the stallion in Virginia for a couple of years.  Then William Amis bought Sir Archy, and stood the horse for 17 years at his plantation, Mowfield, near the Roanoke River in Northampton County, North Carolina.  Even at the advanced age of 24, Sir Archy's stud fee was $100. Amis' son estimated that during the years he stood at Mowfield, Sir Archy earned $76,000 in stud fees.

The stallion became known as the Godolphin Arabian of America, meaning that his influence on the American Thoroughbred was as important as the Godolphin Arabian's influence on European breeding. Like the "Blind Hero of Woodburn", Lexington — who was his great–grandson — Sir Archy became one of America's greatest foundation sires. Throughout the 1820s, the fastest horses in America were descendants of Sir Archy.

In 1827, the Washington DC Jockey Club and the Maryland Jockey Club announced that only a limited number of horses were eligible to run in their races.  Although the fine points of the announcement were complex, it effectively barred all horses sired by Sir Archy; his offspring were so successful that few, if any, horses not sired by Sir Archy bothered to race.   Both Jockey Clubs admitted they were concerned about their long-term viability.

Sir Archy's progeny
Turf historian John Hervey wrote: "Before nor since, nothing has been known in America to equal the manner in which the Archys dominated both turf and stud for over half a century, beginning with the debut of his first crop of foals, in 1814 and culminating with the last of the sixteen seasons of premiership of his inbred great-grandson Lexington in 1878."

As sire

Siring at least 31 racing champions, and influencing the American Quarter Horse through his son Copperbottom, the following is a list of some of his most notable offspring:

 Timoleon (foaled 1814; considered the best race horse of his day, sire of Boston)
 Bertrand (foaled 1826. Some call him Sir Archy's best; became a national leading sire in his own right)
 Sir Charles (foaled 1816; national leading sire in 1830, 1831, 1832, 1833 and 1836)
 Sumpter (foaled 1818; won eight consecutive races when races were grueling heats. Became a broodmare sire of great note)
 Stockholder (foaled 1819; most popular sire in Tennessee at the time.  His daughters were extremely successful producers)
 Lady Lightfoot (foaled 1812; records are incomplete but she may have won 30 – 40 races, racing through age 11.  In her first try, she ran the fastest heats in Maryland up to that time.  As a broodmare, she produced eight foals in nine years.  One, Black Maria, was considered better than her dam)
 Reality (foaled 1813; a filly rated at least as good as Sir Archy or Boston by William R. Johnson. He owned all three at various times)
 Henry (foaled 1819; a very good racehorse, a popular sire, and the only horse to ever defeat American Eclipse)
 Sally Hope (foaled 1822; won 22 of her 27 races, the last 18 in succession)
 Flirtilla (foaled 1828; influential carrier of Sir Archy's blood )

As grandsire and beyond

Into the second generation, Sir Archy's influence became even more pronounced.  This was partly because inbreeding to Sir Archy and to his sire, Diomed, became quite fashionable among American breeders.  In Sir Archy's case, he was bred back to his daughters and his sire's daughters.  This kind of inbreeding, ordinarily risky, was successful for the Sir Archy-Diomed line.
 Bonnets o' Blue (by Sir Charles out of Reality; dam of Fashion.)
 Lexington was by Boston, who was sired by Timoleon.

Retirement

At the age of 26 Sir Archy ended his stud career in 1831, living for two more years until his death in 1833 on June 7.  Coincidentally, this was the same day that one of his greatest sons (Sir Charles) also died.

Sir Archy was one of the first few horses inducted into the National Museum of Racing and Hall of Fame in 1955.

Sir Archy's burial location is disputed between two locations:
Claimed site one: Sir Archy is buried, along with his groom and canine companion, at Ben Lomond Farm in Goochland, Virginia where he was born. A historical marker, erected by the Goochland County (Virginia) Historical Society in 1972, marks his grave. The grave is surrounded by a stone wall and is now hidden by trees in the southeast corner of a field at the top of the farm acreage.
 Claimed site two: Sir Archy is buried at the Mowfield Plantation in Northampton County North Carolina, just west of the town of Jackson. He resided there from 1818 until his death in 1833. His exact location of burial is unknown. The original plantation house still stands. However, when it was renovated, the property owners preferred to live in the house, and updated the interior for modern convenience.

Pedigree

 Sir Archy is inbred 3s x 4d to Herod, meaning Herod appears in the third generation of the sire's side of the pedigree and in the fourth generation of the dam's side.

Sire line tree

Sir Archy
Cicero
Sir Arthur
Director
Aratus
John Henry
Grey Archy
Spring Hill
Tecumseh
Young Sir Archy
Columbus
Warbler
Walk-In-The-Water
Timoleon
Washington
Marquis
Sir John Falstaff
Jackson
Boston
Arrow
Wade Hampton
Arlington
Cost Johnson
Ringgold
Woodford
Ringmaster
Tipperary
Commodore
Gen. Rosseau
Red Eye
Cracker
Billy Cheatham
Bruce
Big Boston
Jack Hawkins
Odd Fellow
Bob Johnson
Lecomte
Sherrod
Umpire
Lexington
Daniel Boone
Goodwood
Colton
Lightning
Optomist
Uncle Vic
Bulletin
Jack Malone
Lexington (Embry)
Thunder
Avalanche
Censor
Frank Boston
Harper
Jim Sherwood
Lexington (Hunter)
War Dance
Union Jack
Copec
Rogers
Asteroid
Beacon
Chesapeake
Cincinnati 
Donerail
Kentucky
Loadstone
Norfolk
Ulverston
Woodburn
Ansel
Bay Dick
Gilroy
Harry of the West
Luther
Veto
Edinborough
Jonesboro
King Lear
Lee Paul
Lever
Merrill
Norway
Red Dick
Watson
Baywood
Concord
King Tom
Marion
Bayonet
Crossroads
General Duke
Hazard
Hotspur
Paris
Pat Malloy
Vauxhall
Barney Willams
Chillecothe
Foster
Kingfisher
Pilgrim
Preakness
Creole Dance
Harry Bassett
Monarchist
Pimlico
Wanderer
Tom Bowling
Acrobat
Breathitt
Jack Boston
King Bolt
Tom Ochiltree
Charley Howard
Fiddlesticks
Shirley
Brown Prince
Frederick the Great
Duke of Magenta
Uncas
Piketon
Zero
Judge Leonard
Carolinian
Contention
Kosciusko
Pulaski
Clermont
Minor
Woodford
Romulus
Greybeard
Napoleon
Virginian
Byron
Mercury
Sidi Hamet
Berthune
Don Juan
Andrew Hamet
Rattler
Marylander
Sir Charles
Collier
Andrew
Count Zaldivar
Frank
Jim Bell
Wagner
Oliver
Voucher
Whale
Rupee
Restless
Monte
Cary Bell
Ashland
Charley Ball
Wagner Joe
Jack Gamble
Jack Gamble Jr.
Red Jacket
Starke
Wissehrad
Endorser
Excel
Joe Stoner
Neil Robinson
Rynodyne
Blarneystone
Sir William
Childers
Roanoke
Grey Beard
Santa Anna
John Hancock
Muckle John
Sumpter
Almanzor
Brunswick
Henry
Robin Hood
Gerow
John Richards
Corsica
Stockholder
Pumpkin Boy
Tempest
Bob Perkins
Arab
Union
Bertrand
McDonough
Richard Singleton
Woodpecker
Grey Eagle
Bulwer
Bertrand Jr.
Hero
Jeff Davis
John Bascombe
Gauglion Gangle
Cherokee
Whalebone
Arnold Harris
Marion
Cymon
John Blount
Phoenomenon
Sir Richard
Sir William of Transport
Sir Leslie
Celestian
Gazan
Monarch
Plato
Robin Adair
Gohanna
Occupant
Waxy
Pacific
Epsilon
Castor
Bill Alexander
Memnon
Saxe Weimer
Crusader
Sir Archy Montorio
Rodolph
Giles Scroggins
Industry
Goldboy
Merlin
Red Gauntlet
Tarriff
Hyazim
Wild Bill
Gandor
Copperbottom
Golddust
Rock
Rocket
Buck
Copperbottom (Captain Edwards)
Copperbottom (Rucker)
Longwaist
Zinganee
George Martin

References

Further reading

External links
 Sir Archy's pedigree and illustration

1805 racehorse births
1833 racehorse deaths
Racehorses bred in Virginia
Racehorses trained in the United States
United States Champion Thoroughbred Sires
United States Thoroughbred Racing Hall of Fame inductees
Byerley Turk sire line
Thoroughbred family 13